Sveinn Eythorsson (born 17 February 1964) is an Icelandic guitarist and software developer. His parents were Sigurbjörg Sveinsdóttir, from Reykjavík and Eyþór Þorláksson from Hafnarfjörður.

Sveinn has developed the information system School Archive used by many music schools in Iceland to keep track of their students.

Education
 1981 – 1986 Conservatori de Música Isaac Albéniz, Girona, Spain. Classical guitar professor diploma.
 1986 – 1987 F. Garrido, Barcelona, Spain. Private guitar lessons.
 1994 – 1996 Högskolan í Skövde, Sweden. Information systems study programme.
 1998 – 1999 Högskolan í Skövde, Sweden. BSc with specialization in information systems.

Musical works
Guitar Methods
[1018] The first guitar milestone. Method for beginners. Drawings by Jean Antoine Posocco. 

Guitar Studies
[1066] 19 Studies.  Preliminary (first four strings) with accompaniment for the teacher. 

Collections
[1099] Their songs. Melodies by guitar pupils, grades 1 – 3, with accompaniment for the teacher. Arr. S. Eythorsson. 

Compositions for Solo Guitar
[1085] 9 easy guitar pieces. 
[1010] Fantasy no. 
[1011] Fantasy no. II. 
[1012] Fantasy no. III.  
[1084] Fantasy no. IV. 
[1087] Fantasy no. V. 
[1136] Fantasy no. VI. 
[1203] The Mountain Stream. 

Duets
[2034] The search. Guitar duet. 
[2035] 7 jazz pieces. Melodies with chords and bass. 

Trios
[3015] Guitar trio no. I. 
[3026] Guitar trio no. II. 
[3023] Guitar trio no. III. 
[3028] Guitar trio no. IV.

References

External links 
 The Guitar School – Iceland
 School Archive – Information System for Music Schools and Art Schools

Classical guitarists
1964 births
Living people